Lord Field may refer to:

 William Field, 1st Baron Field (1813–1907)
 Frank Field, Baron Field of Birkenhead (born 1942)